"Real Hardcore" is a single by Neophyte which was released in the year 1998.

History 
The song was the third single released from the "Hardcore" Album. The female vocals of the song are taken from the Johnny Violent's song "2 Kicks For Yes" from the album Shocker and the samples from "Braincracking" are used from Tracy Bonham's song "Brain Crack" from the album The Burdens of Being Upright.

Track list

Rocco Version 

Real Hardcore was covered by German Dance music group Rocco as Everybody, it was released as the second single from their 2003 album "Dancecore".

History 
It was the second sampled song from the album "Dancecore", after "Back In Town Again". The single was an international breakthrough for the band because it reached the Top Ten in all relevant dance charts. The single sold over 130,000 units and was number 9 on the German singles charts. The song was also published in Austria, Switzerland, Benelux, France, Spain, Italy, Hungary, Poland, Scandinavia, Japan, Taiwan, the United States and Canada. In July 2009 the band released a reworked version of his song under the name "Everybody 9.0"

Track listing

Charts

References 

Techno songs
1998 singles
2001 singles
1998 songs